Scacchi e tarocchi is an album by the Italian singer-songwriter Francesco De Gregori, released in 1985.

The song "A Pà" is dedicated to Pier Paolo Pasolini. Singer-songwriter Ivano Fossati collaborated to the production (songs "Scacchi e tarocchi" and "Miracolo a Venezia") and also played several instruments.

Track listing 
All songs by Francesco De Gregori.

"La storia"
"Scacchi e tarocchi"
"I cowboys"
"Ciao ciao"
"Poeti per l'estate"
"A Pà"
"Sotto le stelle del Messico a trapanar"
"Piccoli dolori"
"Tutti salvi"
"Miracolo a Venezia"

1985 albums
Francesco De Gregori albums
RCA Records albums